Aeromicrobium flavum is a  Gram-positive facultatively  anaerobic and non-motile bacterium from the genus Aeromicrobium which has been isolated from air from the  Wuhan University campus in China.

References 

Propionibacteriales
Bacteria described in 2008